Denmark–Pakistan relations are the foreign relations that are established between Pakistan and Denmark. Pakistan has an embassy in Copenhagen. Denmark also has an embassy in Islamabad; it suffered a suicide car bomb attack in June 2008, killing five Pakistanis and one Dane.

Roughly 20,000 Pakistanis live and work in Denmark, making them the country's fifth-largest non-Western community. Six Pakistani immigrants/descendants of immigrants have seats on local parliaments and councils, the second-highest number of any immigrant group.

Denmark supported Pakistan in their 2010 flood crisis by donating 63 million DKK (10 million euro) in relief efforts and another 130 million DKK (22 million euro) in further development aid. Denmark donated the second highest amount of any European country after the United Kingdom.

The Embassy of pakistan in Denmark opened in 1976.

See also 
 Foreign relations of Denmark 
 Foreign relations of Pakistan

References

 
Bilateral relations of Pakistan
Pakistan